Roger Pramotton (born 17 May 1969) is an Italian former alpine skier.

He is the brother of the other Italian alpine skier Richard Pramotton.

References

External links
 

1969 births
Living people
Italian male alpine skiers
People from Courmayeur
Sportspeople from Aosta Valley